Jay Allen Kleven (December 2, 1949  – June 30, 2009) was a Major League Baseball player in 1976 for the New York Mets. He played in 2 games as a catcher that year due to injuries to starting catcher Jerry Grote and second-string catcher Ron Hodges.  Kleven singled in his next to final at bat as a major leaguer, going one for five for his career.  This lone hit of his career drove in two runs against future Hall-of Famer Bruce Sutter.

Kleven attended California State University, East Bay in Hayward, California, where he played baseball from 1967–1971.  He was named to the All Far Western First Team twice and is listed in the CSUEB Intercollegiate Athletics Hall of Fame.

References

External links

SABR BioProject

1949 births
2009 deaths
Baseball players from Oakland, California
Major League Baseball catchers
American people of Norwegian descent
New York Mets players
Visalia Mets players
Cal State East Bay Pioneers baseball players
People from San Lorenzo, California
Indianapolis Indians players
Tidewater Tides players
Victoria Toros players